Gastrocopta sharae is a species of very small air-breathing land snails, a terrestrial pulmonate gastropod mollusc in the family Vertiginidae.

Etymology
The specific name sharae is a reference to Shar, a fictional deity in the Dungeons & Dragons Forgotten Realms campaign setting.

Distribution 
This species is known only from its type locality, Gruta Revolucionários, a cave located in Goiás state, Brazil.

References

Vertiginidae
Gastropods described in 2017